Surapong Tompa (Thai สุรพงษ์ ทมพา), is a Thai futsal goalkeeper, and currently a member of  Thailand national futsal team.

He competed for Thailand at the 2008 FIFA Futsal World Cup finals in Brazil.

References

Surapong Tompa
1978 births
Living people
Futsal goalkeepers
Surapong Tompa
Surapong Tompa
Southeast Asian Games medalists in futsal
Competitors at the 2011 Southeast Asian Games